Vítor Manuel Jesus Gonçalves (born 13 May 1948 in Almada), known as Baltasar, is a former Portuguese footballer who played as forward.

Football career 

Baltasar gained 1 cap for Portugal, against Switzerland 30 March 1977 in Funchal, in a 1-0 victory.

External links 
 
 

1948 births
Living people
Sportspeople from Almada
Portuguese footballers
Association football forwards
Primeira Liga players
Sporting CP footballers
C.F. Os Belenenses players
Portugal international footballers